Persoonia manotricha is a species of flowering plant in the family Proteaceae and is endemic to Western Australia. It is similar to P. bowgada and P. hexagona but has longer pedicels than P. bowgada and differently grooved leaves from P. hexagona.

Description
The leaf grooves are similar to those of P. bowgada but narrower than those of P. hexagona.

Taxonomy and naming
Persoonia manotricha was first formally described in 2007 by Adrienne Markey and Ryonen Butcher in the journal Nuytsia from specimens collected by Lyndley Craven near Pindar in 1981. The specific epithet (manotricha) is from Greek words meaning "scanty" or "thin" and "hair", referring to the sparse hairs on the ovary.

Distribution and habitat
This geebung mostly grows on rocky hills between Pindar and near Payne's Find in the Avon Wheatbelt, Geraldton Sandplains, Murchison and Yalgoo biogeographic regions of Western Australia.

References

Flora of Western Australia
manotricha
Plants described in 2007